David Wingo is an American television and film composer.

Career 
Wingo began his career writing film scores for David Gordon Green, including George Washington (2000) and All the Real Girls (2003).  His score for Take Shelter (2011), was nominated for a Discovery Of The Year Award at the World Soundtrack Awards. As the composer of the HBO dark comedy series Barry (2018–2023), he was nominated for the 2019 Emmy Award for Outstanding Music Composition for a Series (Original Dramatic Score). He has also recorded three albums with his band, Ola Podrida.

References

External links 

21st-century American composers
21st-century American male musicians
American film score composers
American male composers
American male film score composers
Living people